Ruben Guevara may refer to:

 Ruben Guevara, leader of Ruben and the Jets, an American rock band, active between 1972 and 1974
 Rubén Guevara (Salvadoran footballer) (born 1962), former Salvadoran football player and manager
 Rubén Guevara (Panamanian footballer) (born 1964), retired Panamanian footballer and manager